This is a list of the tallest buildings and structures in the United Kingdom by usage.

Tallest buildings

Tallest castles

*Estimated height

Tallest commercial buildings

The tallest partly commercial building - containing the highest offices - is the  Shard, London.

Tallest government buildings

Tallest hospitals

Tallest hotels

The tallest partly hotel building is the  Shard, London.

Tallest museums and galleries

Tallest places of worship

Tallest residential buildings

The tallest partly residential building - containing the highest apartments - is the  Shard, London.
Deansgate Square South Tower, Manchester stands at 201m tall.
The 47th floor penthouse is the country's third highest apartment.
Deansgate Square East Tower, Manchester is 158m tall.
Elizabeth Tower, Manchester is 153m tall.

Tallest university buildings

Tallest Cinema buildings
Cineworld Glasgow (Glasgow, Scotland) -

Tallest structures
Tallest guyed mast
Skelton transmitting station (Skelton, Cumbria) - 

Tallest freestanding structure
Emley Moor transmitting station (Emley, West Yorkshire) - 

Tallest chimney
Drax Power Station (Drax, North Yorkshire) - 

Tallest free-standing lattice tower
Crystal Palace transmitting station 

Tallest wind turbine
Samsung Heavy Industries 7 MW wind turbine prototype 

Tallest electricity pylon
400 kV Thames Crossing 

Tallest bridge
Queensferry Crossing (Lothian and Fife) - 

Tallest observation tower
Spinnaker Tower (Portsmouth, Hampshire) - 

Tallest ferris wheel
London Eye (Lambeth, London) - 

Tallest stadium
Wembley Stadium (Brent, London) - 

Tallest lighthouse
Skerryvore Lighthouse (Skerryvore, Scotland) - 

Tallest church spire
Salisbury Cathedral (Salisbury, Wiltshire) - 

Tallest clock tower
Joseph Chamberlain Memorial Clock Tower (Birmingham, West Midlands) - 

Tallest domed building
Millennium Dome (Greenwich, London) - 

Tallest water tower
Grimsby Dock Tower (Grimsby, Lincolnshire) - 

Tallest telescope
Lovell Telescope (Goostrey, Cheshire) - 

Tallest air traffic control tower
Heathrow Air Traffic Control Tower (Hillingdon, London) - 

Tallest monument
Wallace Monument (Stirling, Scotland) - 

Tallest rollercoaster
Big One (Blackpool, Lancashire) - 

Tallest sculpture

ArcelorMittal Orbit (London, England) - 

Tallest pagoda
The Pagoda (London, England) - 

Tallest mosque
Birmingham Central mosque (Birmingham, England) - 

Tallest windmill
Moulton Windmill (Moulton, Lincolnshire) - 

Tallest statue
Angel of the North (Gateshead, Tyne and Wear) - 

Dream (St Helens, Merseyside) -

References

 
Usage